{{DISPLAYTITLE:C30H50O}}
The molecular formula C30H50O may refer to:

 Amyrins, a class of triterpene
 achilleol B
 camelliol C
 Cycloartenol, a sterol precursor in photosynthetic organisms and plants
 Friedelin, a triterpene
 Isoarborinol
 Lanosterol, a tetracyclic triterpenoid
 Obtusifoliol
 Lupeol
 2,3-Oxidosqualene
 Parkeol
 Taraxasterol
 Taraxerol